Arguda is a genus of moths in the family Lasiocampidae first described by Frederic Moore in 1879. Species are distributed in Himalayan regions and Nilgiri Mountains of India, Sri Lanka, Myanmar, the Philippines, Singapore and Australia.

Description
Palpi very long. Antennae with branches gradually decreasing to apex. Mid and hind tibia with minute terminal spur pairs. Forewings are broad with rather erect outer margin. Veins 6 and 7 from angle of cell. The stalk of veins 9 and 10 is short. Hindwings with veins 4 and 5 from cell, vein 8 almost touching 7. There are slight accessory costal veinlets.

Species
Arguda angulata
Arguda decurtata
Arguda dodongi
Arguda era
Arguda erectilinea
Arguda formosae
Arguda insulindiana
Arguda rectilinea
Arguda rosemariae
Arguda sandrae
Arguda sumatrana
Arguda tayana
Arguda thaica
Arguda vinata

References

Lasiocampidae
Moth genera